Peter Alfred McLachlan (23 September 1867 – 27 October 1929) was a printer and member of the Queensland Legislative Assembly.

Biography
McLachlan was born in Dundee, Scotland, to parents Andrew McLachlan and his wife Catherine (née McTavish). He came to Queensland with his family in 1873 and attended Gympie Catholic School. On leaving school he became an apprentice printer, working for The Gympie Times and then the Eidsvold Register. He then moved to Brisbane and found work as a journeyman with the Queensland Government Printing Office.

In 1892 he married Mary Donnelly. Awarded the Pro Ecclesia et Pontifice by the pope, McLachlan died after entering the Mater Misericordiae Hospital to undergo an operation in October 1929. His funeral proceeded from St Stephen's Cathedral in Brisbane to the Lutwyche Cemetery.

Public career
At the 1908 Queensland state election, McLachlan, for the Labour Party, and along with David Bowman, won the two member seat of Fortitude Valley. He was the member until 1912 when the seat reverted to a one-member constituency and McLachlan then contested the new seat of Merthyr. He lost by four votes to the Ministerialist candidate, Thomas Welsby but three years later, at the 1915 Queensland state election, he won the seat, beating his opponent Mr Lackey convincingly.

He lost Merthyr at the 1920 state elections to Peter MacGregor, the National candidate but regained the seat in 1923.

McLachlan was also an alderman in the Brisbane Municipal Council, from 1921 until 1924. He served on the Parks Committee for two of those years and was also Chairman of the council's Finance Committee.

References

1867 births
1929 deaths
members of the Queensland Legislative Assembly
burials at Lutwyche Cemetery
politicians from Dundee